Emily Diamond (born 11 June 1991 in Bristol) is a British track and field athlete, who competes in the 200 metres and 400 metres. Diamond came to prominence in her breakout season of 2016 when, following her first win at the British Championships over the 400 metres distance, she collected a gold medal in the 4 x 400 metres relay at the 2016 European Athletics Championships as part of the Great Britain team, followed by a bronze in the same discipline at the 2016 Summer Olympics.

Career
Diamond took up athletics whilst attending Bristol Grammar School, where she notably beat Nicola Phillips in the 1500m at Sports Day. While there she won the junior girls' race at the Bristol Schools' Cross Country Championships. In 2009, representing Avon, she won the English Schools' senior girls' 200 metres title.  Both her mother and grandmother had previously competed for England in long jump.

Diamond was selected for Great Britain team at the 2011 World University Games held in Shenzhen, Guangdong, China. Competing in the 200 metres she progressed to the final and finished eighth. Diamond also ran a leg of the 4 × 400 metres relay winning a bronze medal as part of a team with Kelly Massey, Charlotte Best and Meghan Beesley.

At the 2010 World Junior Championships in Athletics held in Moncton, New Brunswick, Canada, Diamond made the final of the 200 metres and finished in sixth position with a time of 23.62 seconds.

At the 2012 UK Olympic Trials in Birmingham Diamond ran a time of 53.36 seconds to finish fourth in the final of the 400 metres.  This result lead to her being selected as a reserve for the women's 4 x 400 metres relay squad at the Great Britain at the 2012 Summer Olympics in London. Her selection came despite Diamond having only run the distance competitively six times in outdoor competition.

Diamond was part of the English 4 x 400 metres team that won bronze at the 2014 Commonwealth Games, but only ran in the heats.  In 2016, she won a gold medal as part of the Great Britain 4 x 400 m team at the European Championships, her first senior gold medal.

She won a bronze medal in the 4 × 400 metres relay at the 2016 Summer Olympics in Rio.  In the individual event, she reached the semifinals.

She was part of the Great Britain squad that won silver at the 2017 World Championships.

Diamond is a member of the Bristol and West Athletic Club and also represents Loughborough University where she is coached by former international 400 metres runner Jared Deacon.

References

1991 births
Living people
Sportspeople from Bristol
British female sprinters
English female sprinters
Olympic female sprinters
Olympic athletes of Great Britain
Olympic bronze medallists for Great Britain
Olympic bronze medalists in athletics (track and field)
Athletes (track and field) at the 2016 Summer Olympics
Medalists at the 2016 Summer Olympics
Commonwealth Games medallists in athletics
Commonwealth Games bronze medallists for England
Athletes (track and field) at the 2014 Commonwealth Games
Athletes (track and field) at the 2018 Commonwealth Games
Universiade medalists in athletics (track and field)
Universiade bronze medalists for Great Britain
Medalists at the 2011 Summer Universiade
World Athletics Championships athletes for Great Britain
World Athletics Championships medalists
European Athletics Championships winners
European Athletics Championships medalists
British Athletics Championships winners
Team Bath track and field athletes
People educated at Bristol Grammar School
Alumni of Loughborough University
Athletes (track and field) at the 2020 Summer Olympics
Medallists at the 2014 Commonwealth Games